The Men's 2017 European Amateur Boxing Championships were held in the Palace of Sports "Lokomotiv", Kharkiv, Ukraine from 16 to 24 June 2017. It is the 42nd edition of this biennial competition organised by the European governing body for amateur boxing, the EUBC.

Schedule

Participating nations

Medal winners 
The medal winners are:

Medal table

References

External links
Results

European Amateur Boxing Championships
European Amateur Boxing Championships
European Amateur Boxing Championships
Boxing
International boxing competitions hosted by Ukraine
Sport in Kharkiv